Norwegian Lutheran Memorial Church (Norwegian:  Den Norske Lutherske Minnekirke), also known as Minnekirken, is a Lutheran church in Chicago,  Illinois.  It is one of two American churches still using Norwegian as a primary liturgical language, the other being Mindekirken in Minneapolis, Minnesota.

Background
Memorial Church  or Minnekirken in Norwegian, is located at 2614 N. Kedzie Boulevard in an area known as Logan Square. At one time, Logan Square boasted a large Norwegian-American population. With relatively inexpensive housing and rent available, this neighborhood was a favorite for immigrants and working-class citizens. Minnekirken serves as a reminder of a neighborhood heritage long past in which Scandinavians played a significant part. During the first half of the 20th century there were several Norwegian language churches in the Logan Square area and over 20 Norwegian language churches in the metropolitan area. Today, Minnekirken is the last remaining Norwegian-language church in the city. Besides church services, the church continues to host activities, including Norwegian cooking classes, musical concerts and the annual Julejentene Christmas Bazaar.

History
Minnekirken was first built by Norwegian immigrants as Kristus Kirken (Christ Norwegian Lutheran Church) in 1906. Its original congregation lost the church during the Great Depression but a new congregation formed and purchased the church in 1934, changing its name to Minnekirken (Norwegian Lutheran Memorial Church).

Neighborhood
The neighborhood surrounding the church is typical of Chicago's North Side neighborhoods and reflective of a diversity of languages and cultures. In the neighborhood these days, one predominantly hears Spanish spoken in several dialects representing different Hispanic cultures.

See also
 Lutheran Congregations in Mission for Christ

References

External links
Official Website
Norwegian Lutheran Memorial Church
Sjømannskirken Website of The Norwegian Church Abroad, which operates churches in San Francisco, Los Angeles, Houston, New Orleans, Miami and New York

Churches in Chicago
Lutheran church
20th-century Lutheran churches in the United States
Lutheran churches in Illinois